Hanumaan Stuti is a 17th-century shorter version of praise to the Indian God Hanumaan.

It was constructed by Samarth Ramdas in the original Marathi language.
It generally follows the Maruti Stotra sung by pious Marathi people every day.

Maharudra Avataar Haa Suryawanshi |
Anadinaath Purna Tarawayasi ||
Asaa Chaitri Paurnimechaa Janma Jhalaa |
Namaskaar Maajhaa Tayaa Maarutilaa ||1||
 
Tanu Shivshakti Ase Purvajanche |
Kiti Bhagya Varnu Tayaa Anjaniche ||
Tichyaa Bhakti laagi Asaa Janma Jhalaa |
Namaskaar Maajhaa Tayaa Maarutilaa ||2||
 
Gilayasi jaataa taya Bhaskarasi |
Tithe Rahu to yeuni tyajpashi ||
Taya Chandakirnaa maritaa to palalaa |
Namaskaar Maajhaa Tayaa Maarutilaa ||3||
 
Kharaa Brahmachaari manate vichari |
Mhanoni taya bhetalaa Ravanari ||
Dayasagaru bhaktine gauravilaa |
Namaskaar Maajhaa Tayaa Maarutilaa ||4||
 
Sumitrasutaa lagali Shakti jevha |
Dhari roop akraalvikraal tevha ||
Giri anuni shighra to uthavilaa |
Namaskaar Maajhaa Tayaa Maarutilaa ||5||
 
Jagi Bheem to Maruti Brahmachari |
Samastanpudhe tapasi nirvikaari ||
Namu javayaa lagi re mokshapanthaa |
Namaskaar Maajhaa Tumhaa Hanumantaa||6||
 
Jai Jai Raghuvir Samarth||

Hindu devotional texts
Marathi-language literature
Cultural history of Maharashtra
Vaishnavism
17th-century poems
Hymns